Huddlesford is a village 2 km east of the city of Lichfield, in the English county of Staffordshire. Population details as taken at the 2011 census can be found under Whittington. It is bisected by the Trent Valley Line (part of the West Coast Main Line). Most of the population live on narrowboats around Huddlesford canal junction.

See also
Listed buildings in Whittington, Staffordshire

References 
A-Z Great Britain Road Atlas (page 73)

Villages in Staffordshire
Borough of Stafford